Sankt Aegidi is a municipality in the district of Schärding in the Austrian state of Upper Austria.

Geography
Sankt Aegidi lies on the Easter edge of the Sau forest. It is only about 1 km from the Danube, as the crow flies. About 37 percent of the municipality is forest, and 58 percent is farmland.

References

Cities and towns in Schärding District